The National AFL Rising Star award is given annually to a stand out young player in the Australian Football League. The 2002 medal was awarded to  player  Nick Riewoldt.

Eligibility
Every round, an Australian Football League rising star nomination is given to a stand out young player. To be eligible for the award, a player must be under 21 on 1 January of that year, have played 10 or fewer senior games and not been suspended during the season.  At the end of the year, one of the 22 nominees is the winner of award.

Nominations

Final voting
The seven members of the All-Australian team selection panel voted for the National AFL Rising Star for 2002, with each voter ranking their top 5 players from the 22 players nominated during the year.  Nick Riewoldt was award 5 votes by six of the seven voters to win the award.

References

2002 in Australian rules football
2002 Australian Football League season
Australian rules football-related lists